Sonia Faleiro (born 1977) is an Indian  writer. Her first novel The Girl was published by Viking in 2006. This was followed by Beautiful Thing: Inside the Secret World of Bombay's Dance Bars (2010), and the e-single 13 Men (2015). The Good Girls: An Ordinary Killing was published in January, 2021.

Early life and education
Faleiro was born in Goa, grew up in New Delhi where she studied history at St. Stephen's College, and received her master's degree from the University of Edinburgh. While in graduate school, Faleiro started writing her first novel, The Girl, which was published by Penguin Viking in 2006.

Awards
Faleiro was awarded the 2011 Karmaveer Puraskaar for Social Justice for "drawing attention to India's most vulnerable and writing about them with sensitivity, humanity and integrity". She is the recipient of a runners-up award in the CNN Young Journalist Award of 2006.

Bibliography
The Girl (Penguin Viking, 2006)
First Proof: The Penguin Book of New Writing From India II (Penguin, 2006)
Reflected in Water: Writings on Goa (Penguin, 2006)
The Fiction Collection: Twenty Years of Penguin India (Penguin, 2007)
India (ISBN Edizioni, 2008)
AIDS Sutra: Untold Stories from India (Random House, Vintage, Anchor Books, Mondadori, August 2008)
Sarpanch Sahib: Changing the Face of India (Harper Litmus, 2009)
Beautiful Thing: Inside the Secret World of Bombay's Dance Bars (Penguin, India, October 2010)
13 Men (Deca, US, October 2015)
The Good Girls: An Ordinary Killing  (Penguin, 2021)

References

External links
Her official website

Novelists from Goa
21st-century Indian novelists
Indian women novelists
Living people
Indian reporters and correspondents
Alumni of the University of Edinburgh
1977 births
Indian women journalists
21st-century Indian women writers
21st-century Indian journalists
Women writers from Goa